Mary Tobin may refer to:
 Mary Ann Tobin, member of the Kentucky House of Representatives
 Mary Luke Tobin, American Roman Catholic religious sister
 Mary Watts-Tobin, British fencer